CKOV-FM (103.9 FM, 103.9 The Lake) is a radio station in Kelowna, British Columbia. Owned by Paul Larsen via licensee Radius Holdings, Inc., it broadcasts an adult hits format.

History
On March 14, 2008, the CRTC approved in part an application by Vista Broadcast Group for a new FM station to serve Kelowna with an adult hits format. However, the applied for frequency of 96.1 MHz, with an average effective radiated power of 19,900 watts was rejected by the commission as unacceptable, due to approval of another FM station application by Sun Country Cablevision to use 96.3 MHz. Vista subsequently re-filed its application for a new frequency and on August 7 of the same year, the Commission approved the use of 103.9 MHz with an average ERP of 5,200 watts. The station officially launched on September 9, 2008, as CJUI-FM 103.9 The Juice.

On January 31, 2013, the CRTC approved Vista's application to increase CJUI's effective radiated power (ERP) from 5,200 to 17,300 watts (maximum ERP from 10,000 to 36,800 watts), by decreasing the effective height of antenna above average terrain from 506 to -90 metres, by relocating the transmitter site and by changing the class from C1 to C.

Avenue Radio ownership 
In October 2017, the CRTC approved a deal for Vista to sell CJUI to Avenue Radio Ltd., a company owned by Nicholas J. Frost— founder of the local news website Castanet and former owner of CILK-FM. Avenue planned to move the station to a new facility shared with the website on Lawrence Avenue in Kelowna, and planned to increase the station's coverage of local news in the Okanagan region.

On November 1, 2017, CJUI flipped to an oldies format branded as Okanagan Oldies 103.9. In January 2018, its call letters were changed to CKOO-FM to reflect the new branding. On January 2, 2019, CKOO flipped to soft adult contemporary as Soft 103.9.

In April 2019, Castanet announced its sale to Glacier Media. The sale was initially stated to have included CKOO-FM, but Frost and Avenue Radio ultimately retained the station via his company Early Frost Investments.

Bankruptcy, sale to Radius Holdings 
On March 31, 2020, Avenue Radio Ltd. filed for bankruptcy, and CKOO-FM went dark shortly afterwards. Following the shutdown, trustee Grant Thornton sought a new owner for the station's assets. In June 2020, it approved a bid by veteran broadcaster Paul Larsen (one of the former owners of Clear Sky Radio) to acquire the station.

Jim Pattison Broadcast Group and Stingray Radio filed interventions against the proposed sale, alleging that the station's license was abandoned by Avenue Radio, and that Larsen was therefore undermining the CRTC's competitive licensing process (which would require an evaluation of whether the Kelowna market can sustain a new radio station, and a call for competing applicants). However, the CRTC ruled that the license was still valid, citing that the trustee had not formally made a request for it to be revoked, and had "acted expeditiously and in good faith to seek a potential viable operator." The CRTC approved the sale of CKOO-FM to Larsen (via licensee Radius Holdings) in November 2020.

On March 26, 2021, the station officially returned to air and relaunched as 103.9 The Lake, and adopted the heritage callsign CKOV-FM (previously used by what is now CKMR-FM/Strathmore, and locally by what is now CKQQ-FM). The station is promoting itself as a "soft rock" station featuring "adult hits" from the 1970s through the 2000s.

References

External links
103.9 The Lake

KOV
KOV
Radio stations established in 2008
2008 establishments in British Columbia